Ice hockey is a relatively new sport in Iran and is seeing increased popularity. The first official game in the country was played in 2016. The national team was also founded in 2016.

History
Ice hockey was played recreationally before the 1979 Iranian Revolution, however it was banned shortly after. The first official game of Ice hockey was played in Iran on 1 October 2016, between Padideh Shandiz and Khorasan Razavi which was played at the Padideh Ice Rink in Mashhad.

National team
The Iranian men's national team was founded in June 2016. The team played its first international game on 18 February 2017, losing to Macau 7–1, however Iran was supposed to participate at the 2017 Asian Winter Games in Sapporo, Japan, but was disqualified due to the number of Iranian players were deemed ineligible in the regional games. The Olympic Council of Asia allowed Iran to play its scheduled games at the 2017 Asian Winter Games, but it was considered as exhibition games and its results does not count towards the standings of the tournament. The team played its second exhibition game on 20 February 2017 against Indonesia, winning by a score of 10–3.

Iran also has organized a women's national team.

References

Ice hockey in Asia
Sport in Iran